Eduard Eduardavich Baltrushevich (born 18 January 1971) is a Belarusian former professional football player.

His son Ilya Boltrushevich is also a professional footballer.

Club career
Eduard Baltrushevich played for several clubs in Europe, including FC Fakel Voronezh in the Russian Premier League and Petro Płock in the Polish Ekstraklasa.

International career
Baltrushevich made three appearances for the Belarus national football team. He made his international debut on 20 August 1996 in Fürth (Germany), playing the full 90 minutes in a friendly match against United Arab Emirates.

Honours
Dnepr-Transmash Mogilev
 Belarusian Premier League champion: 1998

References

External links
 
 
 
 

1971 births
Living people
Belarusian footballers
Association football defenders
Belarus international footballers
Belarusian expatriate footballers
Expatriate footballers in Russia
Expatriate footballers in Poland
Belarusian expatriate sportspeople in Poland
Russian Premier League players
FC Vitebsk players
FC Dnepr Mogilev players
Wisła Płock players
FC Belshina Bobruisk players
FC Fakel Voronezh players
FC Kristall Smolensk players
FC Neman Grodno players
FC Torpedo Mogilev players
FC Spartak Shklov players
Belarusian football managers